Bulgaria for Citizens Movement is a political party in Bulgaria, founded by former European Commissioner and National Movement for Stability and Progress member Meglena Kuneva on July 1, 2012.

Party Platform
The party has identified three key planks on which they will run the 2013 election.

The first plank, entitled "The Citizen", aims at bringing in more control mechanisms on power, removing obstacles from holding referendums at a local level and steps towards the adoption of a new constitution.

The second plank, entitled "The Economy" describes the party’s dedication towards the growth and stability of the economy. The party is also preparing to bring in "real" reforms in health care, education and old age pensions. The party wishes to return the economy to its pre-2009 level and guide the economy towards above-average EU growth.

The third plank, entitled "Bulgaria of the Future", aims at a radical reform of the judiciary. It calls for the direct election of Supreme Court judges as well as the removal of the prosecution from the justice system.

List of chairmen 
 Meglena Kuneva (2012–2017)
 Dimitar Delchev (2017–2023)
 Yordan Yordanov (2023–present)

Important members
 Plamen Konstantinov 
 Nayden Zelenogorski

Election results

References

External links 
Official Website

Centrist parties in Bulgaria
Liberal parties in Bulgaria
Political parties established in 2012
2012 establishments in Bulgaria